Orthopodomyia anopheloides is a species of zoophilic mosquito belonging to the genus Orthopodomyia. It is found in Andaman Islands, Sri Lanka, Cambodia, China, India, Indonesia, Japan, Malaysia, Nepal, Pakistan, Philippines, Singapore, Taiwan, Thailand, and Vietnam.

References

External links 
DESCRIPTION OF A NEW SPECIES OF ORTHOPODOMYIA THEOBALD FROM MALAYA, WITH A NOTE ON THE GENUS IN THAT COUNTRY (DIPTERA: CULICIDAE)
Studies on Orthopodomyia anopheloides collected as overwintering larvae, at Sabae, Fukui.

anopheloides
Insects described in 1903